Esto is an unincorporated community that is located in Russell County, Kentucky, United States.

References

Unincorporated communities in Russell County, Kentucky
Unincorporated communities in Kentucky